Dents Run Wildlife Management Area is located on  near Mannington in Marion County, West Virginia.  It includes a  lake and will provide hunting opportunities for deer, wild turkey, squirrel, and other species.

Dents Run was leased from CONSOL Energy by the West Virginia Division of Natural Resources and dedicated on September 24, 2010.

References

External links
West Virginia DNR District 1 Wildlife Management Areas

Wildlife management areas of West Virginia
Protected areas of Marion County, West Virginia
Protected areas established in 2010